Fashion Square Mall is an enclosed shopping mall located in the northern edge of Saginaw Charter Township, Michigan. It lies within the boundaries of M-84 (Bay Road) to the west, Tittabawassee Road to the north, Fashion Square Blvd. to the east, and Schust Road to the south. The mall serves the city of Saginaw, its suburbs, and the greater Great Lakes Bay Region . It features more than 100 tenants, including a food court, and its anchor stores are JCPenney and Macy's.

History
Fashion Square Mall opened in 1972 with JCPenney and Sears as its major anchor stores. Hudson's, a chain based in Detroit, Michigan, was added in 1976 to the eastern end, as a third major anchor. The mall also included branches of two local department stores: William C. Wiechmann Company and Heavenrich's, the former of which was liquidated in 1992. In 1981, the mall was part of a lawsuit involving the lease of a Big Boy restaurant which operated within. CBL Properties bought the mall from its developer, Richard E. Jacobs Group, in 2000.

A$10 million mall-wide renovation was completed in 2001, with the addition of new seating areas, family restrooms, and automatic doors. The same year, reflecting nameplate consolidation by Hudson's parent Target Corp., the mall's eastern anchor was re-branded as Marshall Field's, and by 2006, Marshall Field's would be among several nameplates to be converted to the Macy's name. Dunham's Sports also moved out in the 2000s, with Steve & Barry's taking its place in 2005. Steve & Barry's closed in December 2008 after the chain declared bankruptcy. McDonald's closed its food court location in January 2009, as did a Garfield's restaurant in May, only six months after opening in a space vacated by Ruby Tuesday. The Shoe Department Encore replaced the former Steve & Barry's space in mid-2010.

In January 2010, the JCPenney store underwent a remodel, including the addition of a Sephora cosmetics store. Further renovations in 2011 included the addition of DressBarn and Maurices clothing stores, plus a local restaurant called Willow Tree in the former Ruby Tuesday/Garfield's space. An H&M opened in fall 2016.

On August 6, 2019, it was announced that Sears would be closing as part of a plan to close 26 stores nationwide. The store closed in October 2019.

In September 2020, Namdar requested a deed in lieu to give up Fashion Square Mall. As a result, the mall is now managed by the Farbman Group. Kohan Retail Investment Group bought the mall at auction for $10.8 million in September 2022.

References

External links
Official website

Saginaw, Michigan
Shopping malls established in 1972
Shopping malls in Michigan
Buildings and structures in Saginaw County, Michigan
Tourist attractions in Saginaw County, Michigan
Kohan Retail Investment Group